Samuel Mills may refer to:
Samuel Sylvester Mills (1806–1874), Canadian businessman and member of the Senate of Canada
Samuel John Mills (1783–1818), American preacher who helped found the American Bible Society and the American Colonization Society
Samuel Mills (footballer) (1871–?), English footballer
Samuel C. Mills (1833–1911), produced the earliest surviving photographic record of the Oregon Trail and California Trail
Samuel Meyers Mills Jr. (1842–1907), United States Army officer
Samuel Atta Mills (born 1956), Ghanaian politician
 Samuel Mills, early settler after whom Millswood, South Australia is named

See also 
Sam Mills (1959–2005), American football player
Sam Mills III, his son, football coach
Sam Mills (company), a Romanian and European food company
Samuel Milles (died 1727), MP